Aliiroseovarius halocynthiae is a Gram-negative and motile bacterium from the genus of Aliiroseovarius which has been isolated from the sea squirt Halocynthia roretzi from the South Sea in Korea.

References

External links
Type strain of Aliiroseovarius halocynthiae at BacDive -  the Bacterial Diversity Metadatabase

Rhodobacteraceae
Bacteria described in 2012